Desmond Delane Jennings (born October 30, 1986) is an American former professional baseball outfielder. He has previously played in Major League Baseball (MLB) for the Tampa Bay Rays.

Early life
Jennings was born in Birmingham, Alabama, the second of three sons born to Edmond and Paulette Jennings. He is a cousin of NFL lineman Andre Smith. At Pinson Valley High School in Pinson, Alabama, Jennings lettered in baseball, football and basketball. He received an offer from the Georgia Bulldogs to play both baseball and football collegiately.

Jennings was selected by the Cleveland Indians in the 18th round of the 2005 amateur draft out of Pinson Valley High School but did not sign. After failing to qualify academically for the University of Alabama, Jennings decided to enroll at Itawamba Community College to play baseball and football; he led all junior college wide receivers with 54 receptions while scoring 6 touchdowns and netting 848 yards in 8 games. On the diamond, he hit .378 with 29 steals. Jennings was picked by the Tampa Bay Devil Rays in the 10th round of the 2006 amateur draft and signed.

Professional career

Tampa Bay Rays
Jennings was the Rays' fifth-best prospect heading into the 2009 season according to Baseball America, and the 18th-best prospect overall in their midseason top 25.

Jennings was named to the 2010 All-Star Futures Game. From 2008 to 2011, Jennings was a top-100 prospect in baseball in each preseason ranking of both Baseball America and Baseball Prospectus. He peaked at sixth overall in Baseball America's pre-2010 ranking.

In 2010, he batted .278 for the season in Triple-A Durham, and .190 in 21 at-bats with Tampa Bay.

Jennings was called up from Triple-A Durham on July 23, 2011, as the Rays optioned Reid Brignac to Durham.  At the time of his call-up, Jennings was batting .275 and leading the International League in runs scored, with 68.
On July 28, 2011, Jennings blasted his first career home run, a two-run shot against the Oakland Athletics. On September 7, 2011, Jennings hit his first career walk-off home run off Mark Lowe to give the Rays a 5-4 win over the Texas Rangers and give them their 1,000th win in franchise history.

With the departure of B.J. Upton to Atlanta, Jennings began the 2013 season as the starting center fielder and lead-off hitter, with Sam Fuld as his backup. On August 3, Jennings fractured his left middle finger, and was placed on the disabled list 3 days later. Jennings returned on August 19, and finished the season with Tampa Bay. In 139 games, he hit .252/.334/.414 with 14 home runs, 54 RBI, 82 runs scored and 20 stolen bases. He led the team in triples (6) and stolen bases.

On May 7, 2013, Jennings hit a line drive which hit Toronto Blue Jays pitcher J. A. Happ in the head. Happ needed to be carried off the field on a stretcher after an 11-minute delay. Jennings was visibly shaken by the accident but remained in the game.

On May 3, 2015, Jennings was placed on the 15-day disabled list due to left knee bursitis.

On August 26, 2016, The Rays announced that Jennings would be released the next day. Over his seven-year career with the Tampa Bay Rays, he batted .245 with 55 home runs, 191 RBI, and 95 stolen bases.

Cincinnati Reds
On February 9, 2017, Jennings signed a minor league contract with the Cincinnati Reds. He was released by Cincinnati on March 31, 2017.

New York Mets
On April 5, 2017, Jennings signed a minor league contract with the New York Mets; he was assigned to the Mets' Triple-A affiliate, the Las Vegas 51s. He was released from the Mets organization on June 16, 2017.

Acereros de Monclova
On April 11, 2018, Jennings signed with the Acereros de Monclova of the Mexican Baseball League. He became a free agent following the 2018 season.

References

External links

1986 births
Living people
Acereros de Monclova players
African-American baseball players
American expatriate baseball players in Mexico
Charlotte Stone Crabs players
Columbus Catfish players
Durham Bulls players
Itawamba Indians baseball players
Las Vegas 51s players
Major League Baseball outfielders
Mexican League baseball center fielders
Mexican League baseball left fielders
Montgomery Biscuits players
Peoria Javelinas players
Princeton Devil Rays players
Baseball players from Birmingham, Alabama
Tampa Bay Rays players
Vero Beach Devil Rays players
21st-century African-American sportspeople
20th-century African-American people